is a 1989 Japanese tokusatsu cyberpunk body horror film written, produced, edited, and directed by Shinya Tsukamoto. It is shot in the same low-budget, underground-production style as his first two films. The film established Tsukamoto internationally and created his worldwide cult following. It was followed by Tetsuo II: Body Hammer (1992) and Tetsuo: The Bullet Man (2009).

Plot
A metal fetishist enters his Tokyo hideout, which is full of metal parts and photos of famous athletes. He cuts open his thigh and thrusts a large metal rod into the wound. Later, he unwraps the wound to discover it rotting and covered with maggots. Horrified, he runs outside into the street and gets hit by a car.

A salaryman is tormented by visions of metal and industrial machinery. While shaving in his apartment, he notices a metal spike protruding from his cheek that spurts blood when he touches it. He speaks to his girlfriend on the phone, who says she cannot stop thinking about an unknown "incident".

The salaryman is on his way to work. He goes to a train platform and sits next to a woman wearing glasses. She notices a mound of flesh and metal on the ground. She pokes it with a pen and is quickly overcome by it, turning her into a monster controlled by the fetishist. The salaryman flees in terror, briefly able to escape by stabbing the woman with a pen. She soon finds him but he is able to defeat her. After the fight, he realizes the flesh on his arm has turned into metal.

The salaryman dreams of his girlfriend dancing erotically with a phallic hose before sodomizing him with it. When he wakes, the salaryman is horrified to see his metal transformation is accelerating. He and his girlfriend have sex. Afterwards, his girlfriend eats suggestively, each interaction with the food accompanied by metallic screeching sounds. Suddenly the salaryman's penis is transformed into a large metal drill. He loses control and attacks his girlfriend. After she briefly incapacitates him with a blow to the head from a frying pan, he regains his strength through electrocution by sticking a knife and fork into an electrical socket. Finally, she stabs him in the neck with a kitchen knife. Believing that she has killed him, she kills herself by impaling herself on his drill. The salaryman awakens and realizes what has happened, while elsewhere the fetishist laughs maniacally.

A flashback shows a doctor talking to a younger version of the fetishist, who came to him with a piece of metal in his head. The doctor says that he's amazed he's still alive and that it's impossible for him to remove the metal from his head, ultimately advising him to think of it as jewelry.

The salaryman's transformation into "the Iron Man" is complete. He receives a phone call from the fetishist, who tells the Iron Man that he is coming for him. It is revealed that the salaryman and his girlfriend are the ones that struck the fetishist with their car, disposing of the body in the woods and then having sex up against a nearby tree. Upon realizing this, the Iron Man electrocutes himself again.

The fetishist makes his way to the Iron Man's apartment, destroying all metal in his wake and turning his cats into metal. He possesses the body of the dead girlfriend and attacks the Iron Man, eventually emerging in his true form. The fetishist easily overpowers the Iron Man and shows him a post-apocalyptic vision of the "New World" - the Earth consumed by metal. A fight ensues and the fetishist chases the Iron Man across the city, before being briefly incapacitated by a vision from childhood where he is repeatedly beaten by a man with the metal rod that became embedded in his head.

The Iron Man escapes to an old factory, but the fetishist appears and attacks him. The Iron Man uses his powers to manipulate the metal around him and overpower the fetishist. This results in the two men merging into a single phallic mass of metal. They then vow to turn the Earth into a planet made entirely out of metal as they rocket around the city.

Cast
 Tomorowo Taguchi as Man (Salaryman)
 Kei Fujiwara as Woman (Girlfriend)
 Nobu Kanaoka as Woman in Glasses
 Shinya Tsukamoto as Guy (Metal Fetishist)
 Naomasa Musaka as Doctor
 Renji Ishibashi as Tramp

Production
Tsukamoto had previously made two short films of similar subject matter, The Phantom of Regular Size (1986) and The Adventure of Denchu Kozo (1987), and their critical successes gave him the confidence to produce Tetsuo: The Iron Man, all with money saved from his day job.

The film was Tsukamoto's first movie shot on 16mm, all of his previous work having been done with Super 8 cameras. The camera work was split between Tsukamoto and Kei Fujiwara, both of whom also play the roles of major characters. It was shot in black and white with expressionistic lighting, as well as some stop motion animation shots to accomplish the special effects. Parts from discarded TVs were taped onto the actors' skin to create the effect of the body transforming. Tsukamoto chose these handmade methods because he couldn't afford to do it any other way.

Tetsuo: The Iron Man was filmed over 18 months, primarily in Fujiwara's apartment. By the end of the production, most of the crew had abandoned Tsukamoto because the filming conditions were so difficult. In Tom Mes's 2005 book Iron Man: The Cinema of Shinya Tsukamoto, he interviewed Tomorowo Taguchi (the only member of cast/crew who didn't live on set). He noted: "It was very tough so I quickly sensed that if you would stay with them all the time, you would inevitably get the urge to escape. So I figured that if I could keep some distance, I would be able to last much longer and keep a good relationship with them. It's true that almost every day I went there another crew member would have left. One day I arrived at the house and the lighting crew had gone, so I had to do the lighting for Tsukamoto's scenes myself. Toward the end, only the actors were still around. Nearly the entire crew had given up and left by then". Tsukamoto later admitted he had considered burning the film's negatives because the whole production had been such a bad experience.

Release
Tetsuo: The Iron Man struggled to find an audience until it was shown at the 1989 Fantafestival in Rome where it received the award for best film. It was screened without subtitles because the filmmakers couldn't afford to add them. The domestic film rights belong to Japan Home Video, and the film was given a limited theatrical release in Japan at the Nakano Musashino Hall in 1989. It showed mostly in late-night screenings, but had packed audiences after the success at Fantafestival.

After this success in Japan, it was given a limited release in the United States by Original Cinema in 1992. It was subsequently released on VHS by Fox Lorber. The film was released twice on DVD in the United States; by Image Entertainment in 1998 and by Tartan Video in 2005. The film was also released on laserdisc in the United States by Image Entertainment in 1993. All releases are currently out of print.

Arrow Video released of their Solid Metal Nightmares set, a collection of Shinya Tsukamoto's films on Blu-ray, including Tetsuo: The Iron Man, on May 26, 2020.

Reception
Tetsuo: The Iron Man received mostly positive reviews from critics. It currently has a 82% rating on film review aggregate Rotten Tomatoes with an average rating of 7.10/10 based on 14 reviews.

Stephen Holden of The New York Times described the film as having "hyperkinetic pacing and wildly contorted acting" as well as "a perverse sense of humor", and concluded that "the appeal...should be limited to aficionados of weird genre films". Richard Harrington of The Washington Post wrote that the film is "as surreally weird as Eraserhead and as intense as a Novocainless tooth extraction", and that it has  "a nightmarish hyper-reality about it, feeling like a cartoon, but more disturbing for not being one". Slant Magazines Ed Gonzalez rated the film three and a half out of four stars, comparing the film to the works of David Cronenberg. Marc Savlov of The Austin Chronicle praised the film's cinematography, pacing, and themes, calling the film "a ferociously original 16mm nightmare".

Prior to the release of Tetsuo: The Iron Man, Japanese films had largely been ignored by international film festivals. The film's success attracted international attention to Japanese cinema and prompted a revival of Japanese independent film in the 1990s.

Notes

References

External links
 
 
 
 Review at Midnight Eye
 

1989 films
Japanese black-and-white films
Japanese horror films
Biopunk films
Body horror films
Films directed by Shinya Tsukamoto
Films scored by Chu Ishikawa
Films using stop-motion animation
Japanese science fiction horror films
1980s science fiction horror films
Cyberpunk films
Japanese films about revenge
1980s exploitation films
1980s Japanese films